Václav Láska may refer to:

 Václav Láska (mathematician) (1862–1943), Czech astronomer, geophysicist, and mathematician
 Václav Láska (politician) (born 1974), Czech politician